The 1924 Colorado Agricultural Aggies football team represented Colorado Agricultural College—now known as Colorado State University—as a member of the Rocky Mountain Conference (RMC) during the 1924 college football season.  In their 14th season under head coach Harry W. Hughes, the Aggies compiled an overall record of 4–2 with a mark of 3–2 against conference opponents, finished in a thee-way tie for second play in the RMC, and outscored all opponents by a total of 81 to 63.

Schedule

References

Colorado Agricultural
Colorado State Rams football seasons
Colorado Agricultural Aggies football